Monte Olsen (August 8, 1956 – April 8, 2014) was an American politician and professional skier who served as a member of the Wyoming House of Representatives from 2002 to 2008.

Early life and education 
Born in Cheyenne, Wyoming, Olsen graduated from Cheyenne Central High School. He attended Northwest College and University of Wyoming.

Career 
He was a professional skier and a ski instructor at the Jackson Hole Mountain Resort. Olsen served in the Wyoming House of Representatives from 2002 to 2008 as a Republican and lived in Daniel, Wyoming.

Death 
In 2014, Olsen died of a heart attack in a motel room in Jackson Hole, Wyoming.

Notes

1956 births
2014 deaths
Politicians from Cheyenne, Wyoming
People from Sublette County, Wyoming
University of Wyoming alumni
Republican Party members of the Wyoming House of Representatives